POLKAHOLIX is a polka/rock band from Berlin, Germany. Founded in 2001, they have 
re-animated Berlin's polka tradition of Berlin, in their own unique way.

The POLKAHOLIX debut CD "Denkste" was in the top twenty of the WORLD MUSIC CHARTS EUROPE.
The POLKAHOLIX CD was nominated for the German Music Award (category world music).
POLKAHOLIX got a nomination for the Ruth 2005 (category local roots).  ("Ruth" is the award for folk, singer-songwriter and world music in Germany.)

Line-up

 Andreas Wieczorek (saxophone / lead voc)
 Stephan Bohm (trombone / voc)
 Steffen Zimmer (trumpet)
 Christoph Frenz (bass guitar / voc)
 Mario Ferraro (guitar / lapsteel / voc)
 Jo Meyer (accordion / voc)
 Snorre Schwarz (drums / voc)

Media appearances

  2004: The band made an appearance in the movie: "Küss mich, Hexe" (X-Film Creative Pool)
 2005: The band made the music for the TV-documentary: "Monte Klamotte – Eine Expedition zum Berliner Schuldenberg" by Gerd Conradt.

Discography

 2002: "Denkste" (Löwenzahn/Buschfunk)
 2007: "The Great Polka Swindle" (Westpark/Indigo)
 2010: "Polkaface" (Monopol/DAmusic)
 2013: "Rattenscharf" (Monopol/DAmusic) 
 2015: " Sex & Drugs & Sauerkraut" (Monopol/DAmusic)

References

External links
 http://www.polkaholix.de
 http://www.myspace.com/polkaholix
 https://www.facebook.com/official.polkaholix

Musical groups established in 2001
Polka groups
Musical groups from Berlin
Westpark Music artists